Athletics at the 1971 Mediterranean Games were held in Izmir, Turkey.

Results

Men's events

Women's events

Medal table

References

External links
Complete 1971 Mediterranean Games Standings.
Mediterranean Games – Past Medallists. GBR Athletics.

Med
Athletics
1971